Chukna is a rural locality (a selo) in Kurklinsky Selsoviet, Laksky District, Republic of Dagestan, Russia. The population was 156 as of 2010.

Geography 
Chukna is located 20 km north of Kumukh (the district's administrative centre) by road. Kurkli and Kuma are the nearest rural localities.

Nationalities 
Laks live there.

Famous residents 
 Dzhamalutdin Muslimov (People's Artist of the DASSR, People's Choreographer)

References 

Rural localities in Laksky District